Breathitt County is a county in the eastern Appalachian portion of the U.S. state of Kentucky. As of the 2020 census, the population was 13,718.  Its county seat is Jackson. The county was formed in 1839 and was named for John Breathitt, who was Governor of Kentucky from 1832 to 1834. Breathitt County was a prohibition or dry county, until a public vote in July 2016 that allowed alcohol sales.

History
The area now encompassed by Kentucky's Breathitt County was first bounded in 1772, when all of what is now the state of Kentucky was in the frontier county of Fincastle County, Virginia. Fincastle was divided in 1776, with the western portion named Kentucky County, Virginia. In 1780, Virginia set aside all land in Kentucky County for soldiers who had served in the Revolutionary War. In 1780, Kentucky County was divided into 3 counties, Jefferson, Fayette, and Lincoln. Lincoln County was divided in 1799, with part becoming Knox County. In 1807, the Legislature partitioned the upper part of Knox to create Clay County. On February 6, 1839, a portion of Clay (along with portions of Estill and Perry Counties) was partitioned off to create Breathitt County. It was named for Governor John Breathitt.

Geography

The North and Middle Forks of the Kentucky River pass through the county as the main water drainages.

Adjacent counties

 Wolfe County - northwest
 Magoffin County - northeast
 Knott County - east
 Perry County - southeast
 Owsley County - southwest
 Lee County - west

Demographics

As of the census of 2000, there were 16,100 people, 6,170 households, and 4,541 families in the county. The racial makeup of the county was 98.69% White, 0.39% Black or African American, 0.09% Native American, 0.29% Asian, 0.02% Pacific Islander, 0.08% from other races, and 0.43% from two or more races. 0.66% of the population were Hispanic or Latino of any race.

There were 6,170 households, out of which 34.10% had children under the age of 18 living with them, 55.00% were married couples living together, 14.20% had a female householder with no husband present, and 26.40% were non-families. 23.80% of all households were made up of individuals, and 9.00% had someone living alone who was 65 years of age or older. The average household size was 2.54 and the average family size was 3.00.

The county population contained 25.50% under the age of 18, 10.00% from 18 to 24, 28.90% from 25 to 44, 24.00% from 45 to 64, and 11.50% who were 65 years of age or older. The median age was 36 years. For every 100 females there were 97.40 males. For every 100 females age 18 and over, there were 92.70 males.

The median income for a household in the county was $19,155, and the median income for a family was $23,721. Males had a median income of $26,208 versus $20,613 for females. The per capita income for the county was $11,044. About 28.10% of families and 33.20% of the population were below the poverty line, including 42.90% of those under age 18 and 26.80% of those age 65 or over.

Politics

Economy

Coal companies
 Arch Coal
 US Coal

Education

Jackson Independent Schools
Jackson Independent Schools is a school district that educates students inside and outside the city limits of Jackson, Kentucky.
 Jackson City School – a single K-12 facility.

Breathitt County Schools
Breathitt County Schools is another school district with an array of schools within the city limits of Jackson, Kentucky and throughout the county.
 Sebastian  Elementary School – Jackson, Kentucky (Opened 1970)
 Highland-Turner Elementary School – Canoe, Kentucky (Opened 1992)
 Rousseau Elementary School (Closed 2013) – Rousseau, Kentucky
 Marie Roberts-Caney Elementary School – Lost Creek, Kentucky (Expanded School Opened 1996)

 Breathitt County High School – Jackson, Kentucky (New School Opened 1982)

Private schools
 Mount Carmel School – Vancleve, Kentucky
 Oakdale Christian Academy – Jackson, Kentucky
 Riverside Christian School – Lost Creek, Kentucky

Higher education
 Lees College Campus of Hazard Community and Technical College (part of the Kentucky Community and Technical College System)  – Jackson, Kentucky
 Kentucky Mountain Bible College – Vancleve, Kentucky

Breathitt Area Technology Center
The Breathitt Area Technology Center serves both the Jackson Independent and the Breathitt County school districts. It is located in Jackson on the campus of Breathitt County High School. The school is operated by the state of Kentucky. While most of the funding comes from the state, much of the equipment is purchased with federal Carl D. Perkins Vocational and Technical Education Act funds, which are aimed at advancing technical education.

The school is focused on technical education, offering these technical programs:
 Automotive Technology
 Construction Technology
 Electrical Technology
 Health Sciences
 Office Technology

UK Robinson Station
The community of Quicksand is the location for the University of Kentucky Robinson Station. This agriculture research facility is a pivotal asset in Breathitt County, furthering the scientific studies in the areas of agriculture and forestry.

Health care
 Breathitt County Family Health Center, Jackson, Kentucky

Breathitt County health care providers were featured in a November 23, 2013 article in The Washington Post: "In Rural Kentucky, Health-Care Takes Back Seat as the Long-Uninsured Line Up". As of 2014 the county had the highest morbidity rate in the state of Kentucky.

Communities

 Altro
 Bays
 Caney
 Canoe
 Chenowee
 Clayhole
 Cockrell Fork (on line between Breathitt and Perry Counties)   
 Crockettsville
 Elkatawa
 Evanston
 Fishtrap
 Flintville
 Frozen/Frozen Creek
 Fugates Fork
 
 Haddix
 Hardshell Caney
 Hayes Branch
 Jackson (county seat)
 Leatherwood
 Lost Creek
 Morris Fork
 Ned
 Nix Branch
 Noble
 Noctor
 Oakdale
 Portsmouth
 Quicksand
 River Caney
 Riverside
 Rose Branch
 Rousseau
 Rowdy
 Saldee
 Sebastians Branch
 Shoulder Blade/Shoulderblade
 Smith Branch
 South Fork
 Stevenson
 Troublesome Creek
 Turners Creek
 Vancleve
 War Creek
 Watts
 Whick
 Wilstacy
 Wolf Coal

Notable people
 Kim Davis, the Rowan County clerk known for her refusal to comply with a federal court order directing her to issue marriage licenses to same-sex couples, was born in Breathitt County.
 Jeffrey Reddick, writer for the Final Destination franchise, was born in Jackson.
 Sturgill Simpson, country music artist/singer was born in Jackson, the county seat of Breathitt County and spent much of his childhood there.

See also

 National Register of Historic Places listings in Breathitt County, Kentucky
 Robinson Forest

References

Further reading
 T.R.C. Hutton, Bloody Breathitt: Politics and Violence in the Appalachian South. Lexington, KY: University Press of Kentucky, 2013.

External links
 The Kentucky Highlands Project
 The Breathitt County Museum – Provides a wealth of information on the rich history of Breathitt County.
 UK Robinson Station
 http://www.breathittcounty.com – hundreds of photos and articles about Breathitt County
 Breathitt County Public Schools
 Breathitt Area Technology Center
 Breathitt County History & Ancestry

 
1839 establishments in Kentucky
Populated places established in 1839
Kentucky counties
Counties of Appalachia